Siouxsie and the Banshees were a British rock band. Formed in September 1976, the group originally consisted of vocalist Siouxsie Sioux, bassist Steven Severin, guitarist Marco Pirroni and drummer Sid Vicious. The first recording line-up featured John McKay and Kenny Morris in place of Pirroni and Vicious. Siouxsie and Severin were members throughout the band's entire lifetime, alongside drummer Peter "Budgie" Clarke who joined in 1979. and a rotating cast of guitarists including John McGeoch. The band broke up in 1996 but reformed for a tour in 2002 with a line-up of Siouxsie, Severin, Budgie, and guitarist Knox Chandler.

History
Vocalist Siouxsie Sioux (real name Susan Ballion) and bassist Steven Severin (real name Steven Bailey) formed Siouxsie and the Banshees in September 1976, debuting with a line-up including guitarist Marco Pirroni and drummer Sid Vicious (real name John Ritchie). Two months after the performance, Pirroni and Vicious were replaced by Peter Fenton and Kenny Morris, respectively, although Fenton was sacked after a live show the following May due to stylistic differences with the other members. By July he had been replaced by John McKay, who also contributed saxophone to the group. The line-up of Siouxsie, McKay, Severin and Morris released two studio albums – 1978's The Scream and 1979's Join Hands – before McKay and Morris both left suddenly on the eve of the start of a UK tour in September 1979.

The tour resumed a few weeks later with the Cure frontman Robert Smith and the Slits drummer Peter "Budgie" Clarke substituting for the departed members. Budgie subsequently became a full-time member of the band, while John McGeoch joined as McKay's permanent replacement early the following year. He became an official member in July. McGeoch performed on Kaleidoscope, Juju and A Kiss in the Dreamhouse, before he was fired at the beginning of November 1982 due to problems with alcohol abuse which resulted in his hospitalisation. The vacated guitarist spot was again taken by Robert Smith. The Cure frontman became a full member of the Banshees, contributing to 1984's Hyæna, before leaving three weeks before its tour due to "nervous strain and exhaustion".

Smith was replaced by former Clock DVA guitarist John Valentine Carruthers, who performed on The Thorn and Tinderbox before leaving in February 1987 due to disagreements with the rest of the band. The band became a quintet in July 1987 when a new line-up was unveiled with Jon Klein on guitars alongside multi-instrumentalist Martin McCarrick on keyboards, cello and accordion. This line-up remained stable for almost eight years, before Klein was replaced by former Psychedelic Furs guitarist Knox Chandler for the tour in support of 1995's The Rapture. After a final run of live shows, Siouxsie and the Banshees disbanded in April 1996. Sioux, Chandler, Severin and Budgie reformed the Banshees for a final tour in 2002, which spawned the live release The Seven Year Itch.

Members

Timeline

Lineups

References

External links
Siouxsie and the Banshees official website

Siouxsie and the Banshees